Bifuhalol is a phlorotannin.  The ethanol extract of the brown alga Sargassum ringgoldianum contains phlorotannins of the bifuhalol type, which shows an antioxidative activity.

References 

Phlorotannins
Natural phenol oligomers